The Ozark chub (''Erimystax harryi') is a species of ray-finned fish in the family Cyprinidae.
It is found in mountain streams in the Ozarks in Missouri and Arkansas. It is currently petitioned for federal protection under the Endangered Species Act.

References

Erimystax
Fish described in 1956
Freshwater fish of the United States